Margaryta Volodymyrivna Pesotska (born 9 August 1991 in Kyiv, Ukraine) is a Ukrainian table tennis player.

Career
Pesotska competed at the 2008 Summer Olympics, reaching the first round of the singles competition. She won the silver medal in singles event at the Table Tennis European Championships in 2009. Two years later she repeated her success by winning bronze at the 2011 European Championships. Next European-level success in the singles event came in 2018 when she reached finals at the European championships.

At the 2012 Summer Olympics, she reached the third round of the singles competition. Pesotska was also expected to participate at the 2016 Summer Olympics and was even granted an invitation but she withdrew from the Games due to injury.

Pesotska competed at the 2015 European Games where she lost in the quarterfinals in singles event and finished 4th in team event where Ukraine lost in bronze medal match to the Czech Republic.  Pesotska is also 2015 European championships bronze medalist in women's team competition.

In March 2021, Pesotska played in WTT Doha. In the WTT Contender event, she upset eighth seed Adriana Diaz in the round of 32 but lost to Xiaona Shan in the round of 16. However, she was in turn upset by breakout star Shin Yubin in the round of 32 of the WTT Star Contender Event. In June, at the delayed 2020 European Championships, Pesotska won a bronze medal in the women's singles.  At the Tokyo 2020 Olympics she was defeated by India's Manika Batra in the second round.

Personal life
She graduated from National Pedagogical Dragomanov University.

On 27 June 2015, she married her boyfriend Andrii Bratko.

References

1991 births
Living people
Sportspeople from Kyiv
Ukrainian female table tennis players
Table tennis players at the 2008 Summer Olympics
Olympic table tennis players of Ukraine
Table tennis players at the 2012 Summer Olympics
European Games competitors for Ukraine
Table tennis players at the 2015 European Games
Table tennis players at the 2019 European Games
Table tennis players at the 2020 Summer Olympics
21st-century Ukrainian women